Cardiff Greyhounds was the greyhound racing operation held at Cardiff Arms Park in Cardiff from 1927-1977. It is not to be confused with the greyhound racing held from 1928-1937 at the White City Stadium, Cardiff.

Origins and opening
To assist with maintenance of the site, a greyhound track was built around the rugby pitch in 1927. The first meeting was held on 7 April 1928.

Pre war history
The Arms Park (Cardiff) Greyhound Racing Company Limited signed a 50-year lease in 1937, with Cardiff Athletic Club (the owners of the Arms Park) and having no rights to break the agreement or to review the rental until 50 years expired.

The circumference of the track was a large 452 yards with long straights of 160 yards. An 'Outside Sumner' hare was used and race distances consisted of 300, 500, 525 and 700 yards. The kennel facilities were at nearby Cefn Mably in St Mellons and the leading event was the Glamorgan Cup held over 500 yards.
1991

In 1932 a notable greyhound called Beef Cutlet made his debut at the track. Beef Cutlet won the Glamorgan Cup and set a new track record, in 28.41 seconds. His Waterhall kennels based trainer John Hegarty would later become a Racing Manager at the track.

In 1937 the Greyhound Racing Association closed the nearby White City stadium, leaving the Arms Park as the sole Cardiff venue. John Jolliffe was Racing Manager here in 1937 arriving from Aberdeen before he secured the Racing Manager's position at Wembley.

Post war history

After the war the Welsh Greyhound Derby was transferred to the Arms Park from White City. This was one of the three competitions that formed the triple crown along with the English Greyhound Derby and Scottish Greyhound Derby. The track continued to host the race annually. Racing was held on Monday and Saturday evenings.

The greyhound company introduced floodlights in 1958 which upset the rugby fans. The Welsh Derby was won by the likes of Trev's Perfection (who completed the Triple Crown in 1947), Local Interprize, Ballycurreen Garrett, Ballylanigan Tanist, Endless Gossip, Rushton Mac and Mile Bush Pride in a golden era. The event was so popular that despite the stadium being taken over for the 1958 British Empire and Commonwealth Games the track was re-laid in time for the Welsh Derby to take place in October. In 1971 the Welsh Greyhound Derby was given 'classic' status.

Problems for greyhound racing started after Glamorgan County Cricket Club moved out of the cricket ground (known as the north ground) to Sophia Gardens in 1966. The north ground was subsequently demolished and a new rugby union stadium built in its place for Cardiff RFC, who would move out of the Arms Park because Cardiff Athletic Club had  transferred the freehold of the Arms Park (south ground) to the Welsh Rugby Union in July 1968. This still left a greyhound track around the Arms Park but despite the Welsh Derby gaining classic status there was no place for greyhound racing when the plans for the new National Stadium were drawn up on the site in 1977 by the Cardiff City Council. The Council had taken less than ten minutes to reject a plan to switch greyhound racing to nearby Maindy Stadium.

Closure
The last Welsh Greyhound Derby was on 9 July. The last meeting was held on 30 July 1977 which attracted just 1,128 greyhound fans who witnessed Lillyput Queen, owned by Cardiff butcher Malcolm Davies and trained by Freddie Goodman, win the last race. After the closure, greyhound racing in Wales remained on only three flapping (unlicensed) tracks, Swansea, Bedwellty Greyhound Track and Ystrad Mynach.

Harry George secretary of Greyhound Company Cardiff failed in a bid for Oxford Stadium following Cardiff's closure.

Competitions
Welsh Greyhound Derby
Glamorgan Cup

Track records

See also
 Cardiff Arms Park

References

Greyhound racing in the United Kingdom
Defunct greyhound racing venues in the United Kingdom
Greyhound racing in Wales
1927 establishments in Wales
Sports venues completed in 1927
Sports venues demolished in 1977
Sport in Cardiff
1977 disestablishments in Wales